Etyka (Polish for "ethics") is a peer-reviewed academic journal covering moral philosophy, published by the Institute of Philosophy (University of Warsaw). It  was established in 1966, but publication was interrupted between 1990 and 1993. Etyka publishes articles on ethics, applied ethics, history of ethics, psychology and sociology of morality, ethical education, and texts concerning current ethical controversies. Editors-in-chief have been Marek Fritzhand (1966-1967), Henryk Jankowski (1968-1992), and Barbara Skarga (1993-2006). Since 2006, the editor-in-chief is Paweł Łuków.

References

External links
 

Ethics journals
Polish-language journals
Annual journals
Publications established in 1966
University of Warsaw
Academic journals published in Poland